Stallion Head Branch is a  long 1st tributary to Gum Branch in Sussex County, Delaware.  This is the only stream of this name in the United States.

Course
Stallion Head Branch rises about 1.5 miles southeast of Staytonville, Delaware and then flows south to join Gum Branch about 0.75 miles southwest of Oakley, Delaware.

Watershed
Stallion Head Branch drains  of area, receives about 45.4 in/year of precipitation, has a topographic wetness index of 757.38 and is about 4% forested.

See also
List of Delaware rivers

References

Rivers of Delaware
Rivers of Sussex County, Delaware
Tributaries of the Nanticoke River